Events from the year 1742 in Russia

Incumbents
 Monarch – Elizabeth I

Events

  
 The Lopukhina Conspiracy arises at the Russian court.
Peter III of Russia is brought to Russia from Germany by his aunt, Elizabeth I, to be received by the Russian Orthodox Church and declared heir to the Russian throne.
Christian Goldbach becomes a staff member of the Russian Ministry of Foreign Affairs and proposes what will become known as Goldbach's conjecture in a letter to Leonhard Euler.
Elizabeth I reconfirms a Ukase issued by Peter the Great and expels Jews from the Russian Empire.

Births

 Yemelyan Pugachev was an ataman of the Yaik Cossacks who led a great popular insurrection during the reign of Catherine the Great. (d. 1775)

Deaths

References

1742 in Russia
Years of the 18th century in the Russian Empire